The men's singles of the 2006 ECM Prague Open tournament was played on clay in Prague, Czech Republic.

Jan Hernych was the defending champion, but lost in second round to Tomáš Zíb.

Robin Vik won the title by defeating Jan Hájek 6–4, 7–6(7–4) in the final.

Seeds

Draw

Finals

Top half

Bottom half

External Links
 Main Draw
 Qualifying Draw

2006 Men's Singles